Apodrepanulatrix is a genus of moths in the family Geometridae.

Species
 Apodrepanulatrix liberaria (Walker, 1860)
 Apodrepanulatrix litaria (Hulst, 1887)

References
 Apodrepanulatrix at Markku Savela's Lepidoptera and Some Other Life Forms

Caberini
Geometridae genera